Richard Mathews Hyne was a politician in Queensland, Australia. He was a Member of the Queensland Legislative Assembly.

He was the founder of the Hyne & Son timber milling company. In 1879 he was appointed one of the founding trustees of Maryborough Boys Grammar School.

References

Members of the Queensland Legislative Assembly
1839 births
1902 deaths
19th-century Australian politicians